Renzo Bulgarello (31 March 1948 – 8 June 2020) was an Italian rower. He competed in the men's eight event at the 1972 Summer Olympics.

References

External links
 

1948 births
2020 deaths
Italian male rowers
Olympic rowers of Italy
Rowers at the 1972 Summer Olympics
Place of birth missing